Windy & Breezy are Walter Lantz characters, who made their first appearance in the cartoon "Fodder and Son", in 1957. Their final appearance was in 1959, in "Bee Bopped".

List of appearances 
"Fodder and Son" (11/4/1957)
"Salmon Yeggs" (03/24/1958)
"Three Ring Fling" (10/06/1958)
"Truant Student" (01/05/1959)
"Bee Bopped" (06/15/1959)

See also
List of Walter Lantz cartoons
List of Walter Lantz cartoon characters

References

External links 
 
 The Walter Lantz-o-Pedia

Fictional anthropomorphic characters
Universal Pictures cartoons and characters
Walter Lantz Productions shorts
Fictional bears
Fictional families
Film characters introduced in 1957
Animated duos
Walter Lantz Productions cartoons and characters
Male characters in animation
Child characters in animated films